Pumarín Club de Fútbol is a football team based in Oviedo in the autonomous community of Asturias. Founded in 1918, the team plays in Regional Preferente. The club's home ground is Campo de Fútbol Luis Oliver, which has a capacity of 500 spectators.

History
The biggest success of the club was in the 1990–91 season, when they qualified in the fourth position of the Group II of Tercera División and played the promotion playoffs to Segunda División B.

After that success, Pumarín qualified for the 1991–92 Copa del Rey, where it was defeated in the first round by CD Mosconia.

Season to season

19 seasons in Tercera División

External links
Official website 
Futbolme.com profile 

Football clubs in Asturias
Association football clubs established in 1918
Divisiones Regionales de Fútbol clubs
1918 establishments in Spain
Sport in Oviedo